Daniel Martin is a Bildungsroman novel written by English author John Fowles and first published in 1977 by Jonathan Cape. It follows the life of the eponymous protagonist, using both first and third person voices, whilst employing a variety of literary techniques such as multiple narratives and flashback. The author suggests that the book is concerned with "Englishness - what it is like to be English in the late 20th century.

Plot summary 

Daniel Martin is the story of a Hollywood screenwriter who returns to his native England when a friend from university asks to see him before he dies. With flashbacks to his childhood in the 1940s and time at university in Oxford, a tale of frustrated love emerges. The dying man (Anthony) asks him to look after his wife Jane. Daniel had, in fact, married Jane's sister, despite loving Jane and having spent one night with her.

While in England, Daniel improves relations with his daughter (Caro) and his estranged wife (Nell). Then Daniel and Jane go on a cruise visiting Egypt, Syria, and Lebanon; and the two fall in love again. Daniel breaks up with his Scottish girlfriend, and the two lovers are reunited at the end of the book.

Characters in Daniel Martin

Writing

In summer 1969 Fowles commenced work on 'The Two Englishmen', which he renamed 'Futility', which then became Daniel Martin. A second draft was begun in April 1974 and he worked on the novel consistently throughout 1974/75. Final amendments were made in March 1977.

Major themes

The novel can be seen as autobiographical. John Fowles states in an interview: "You are every character you write. In Daniel Martin, where I describe myself travelling all over America, I probably revealed more of myself than anywhere else."

In exploring the relationships between the main characters, Fowles takes the chance to expand upon such topics as aesthetics, philosophy of cinema, archeology, imperialism and the differences between Britain and the United States.

John Gardner calls upon Daniel Martin many times in the first half of On Moral Fiction; it is to him a reflection of John Fowles's valid opinion regarding art—namely, that true art ought to instruct.  The same notion was Gardner's central thesis in On Moral Fiction.

Literary significance and reception

Robert McCrum states "It was the American literary press that saluted Daniel Martin; the English critics who murdered it." Writing in The New York Times William H. Pritchard opined "This new, long, ambitious novel must be judged [Fowles's] best piece of work to date and is a masterly fictional creation, dense with fact."

References 
 John Fowles–The Web Site

Further reading 

 Park S. Time and Ruins in John Fowles's "Daniel Martin" in "John Fowles" Modern Fiction Studies   1985, vol. 31, no 1, pages 157-163 ISSN 0026-7724
 Post-Pastoral in John Fowles’s "Daniel Martin" Wilson Organization Environment. 2005; 18: 477-488
 Discussion threads on Daniel Martin: http://fowlesbooks.com/forum/viewforum.php?f=5

1977 British novels
British bildungsromans
English-language books
Jonathan Cape books
Novels by John Fowles